The men's 1500 metre freestyle event at the 1948 Olympic Games took place between 5 and 7 August, at the Empire Pool. This swimming event used freestyle swimming, which means that the method of the stroke is not regulated (unlike backstroke, breaststroke, and butterfly events). Nearly all swimmers use the front crawl or a variant of that stroke. Because an Olympic size swimming pool is 50 metres long, this race consists of 30 lengths of the pool.

Medalists

Results

Heats

Semifinals

Key:  Q = qualification by place in heat, q = qualification by overall place

Final

References

Men's freestyle 1500 metre
Men's events at the 1948 Summer Olympics